Allen Township is a township in Kingman County, Kansas, USA.  As of the 2000 census, its population was 109.

Geography
Allen Township covers an area of 36.67 square miles (94.96 square kilometers); of this, 0.25 square miles (0.65 square kilometers) or 0.68 percent is water. The stream of Coon Creek runs through this township.

Adjacent townships
 Vinita Township (north)
 Erie Township, Sedgwick County (east)
 Eden Township, Sumner County (southeast)
 Bennett Township (south)
 Canton Township (southwest)
 Eagle Township (west)
 Dale Township (northwest)

Cemeteries
The township contains one cemetery, Mount Pleasant.

References
 U.S. Board on Geographic Names (GNIS)
 United States Census Bureau cartographic boundary files

External links
 City-Data.com

Townships in Kingman County, Kansas
Townships in Kansas